El Taref is a province (wilaya) of Algeria. El Kala is a port town in this province. El Taref is the capital city. El Kala, a port town in this province, is home to El Kala National Park.

History
The province was created from parts of Annaba Province and Guelma Province in 1984.

Administrative divisions
It is made up of 7 districts, divided into 24 municipalities.

Districts

 Ben M'Hidi
 Besbes
 Bouhadjar
 Boutheldja
 Dréan
 El Kala
 El Taref

Communes

 Ain El Assel 
 Ain Kerma
 Asfour
 Ben Mehdi
 Beni Amar
 Berrihane
 Besbes
 Bougous
 Bouhadjar
 Bouteldja
 Chebaita Mokhtar
 Chefia
 Chihani
 Dréan
 El Aioun (Algeria)
 El Chatt 
 El Kala
 El Taref
 Hammam Beni Salah
 Lac des Oiseaux
 Oued Zitoun
 Raml Souk Souarekh
 Zerizer
 Zitouna

References

 
Provinces of Algeria
States and territories established in 1984